Oso, or OSO, may refer to:

Oso-Edda, an autonomous community in eddaland in Afikpo south local government area of Ebonyi state, southern Nigeria.
Oso, California, a former settlement in Yuba County, California
Oso, Ontario, a community and former township now part of Central Frontenac Township, Ontario, Canada
Oso, Washington, a census-designated place in Snohomish County, Washington

Music
Oṣó, sixth studio album by Brymo
Oso Oso, an emo band

Other
Oakville Symphony Orchestra
Ose (demon) or Oso
Onsala Space Observatory
Orbiting Solar Observatory, series of nine satellites
OSO 3
OSO 7
Ottawa Symphony Orchestra
Om Shanti Om, Hindi film starring Shahrukh Khan, Deepika Padukone and Arjun Rampal
 Special Council of the NKVD; Russian "ОСО," transliterated "OSO"
Special Agent Oso, a Disney Channel animated show for children
Osborne Mine Airport, IATA airport code "OSO"

See also
El Oso, 1998 album by Soul Coughing
El Oso, Ávila, in Spain
Oso Kuka, Albanian folk hero